is a Japanese instructor of Shotokan karate. He has won the JKA's version of the world championships for kata on 2 occasions. He has also won the JKA All-Japan championships for kata on 7 occasions and once for kumite. He is currently an instructor of the Japan Karate Association.

Biography

Kazuaki Kurihara was born in Ibaraki Prefecture, Japan on 20 August 1979. He studied at Komazawa University. His karate training began during his Age 5.

Competition
Kazuaki Kurihara has had considerable success in karate competition.

Major Tournament Success
56th JKA All Japan Karate Championship (2013) - 1st Place Kata
55th JKA All Japan Karate Championship (2012) - 1st Place Kata
12th Funakoshi Gichin Cup World Karate-do Championship Tournament (Pattaya, 2011) - 1st Place Kata
54th JKA All Japan Karate Championship (2011) - 1st Place Kumite
54th JKA All Japan Karate Championship (2011) - 1st Place Kata
53rd JKA All Japan Karate Championship (2010) - 1st Place Kata
52nd JKA All Japan Karate Championship (2009) - 1st Place Kata
50th JKA All Japan Karate Championship (2007) - 1st Place Kata, 3rd Place Kumite
10th Funakoshi Gichin Cup World Karate-do Championship Tournament (Sydney, 2006) - 1st Place Kata
49th JKA All Japan Karate Championship (2006) - 1st Place Kata
48th JKA All Japan Karate Championship (2005) - 2nd Place Kata

References

 

1979 births
Japanese male karateka
Karate coaches
Shotokan practitioners
Sportspeople from Ibaraki Prefecture
Living people
20th-century Japanese people
21st-century Japanese people